The Animalist Party with the Environment (PACMA) is a Spanish political party founded in Bilbao on 24 February 2003. It is focused on animal rights and animal welfare, as a part of the requirement of respect for the right to life. Although its headquarters were initially in Barcelona, it is now established in Madrid.

During the Spanish elections in December 2015, PACMA received 1,034,617 votes for the Senate and 219,000 for the Congress, but did not have any representatives elected due to particularities of the Spanish Electoral Law. By number of votes, PACMA widely overcame other parties that did win seats in the Congress and Senate. In order to achieve a law in which every vote is worth the same, PACMA is now campaigning for electoral reform.

Electoral performance

Cortes Generales

European Parliament

See also
 Animal Politics EU
 Anti-bullfighting city
 List of animal advocacy parties

References

External links

Euro Animal 7

2003 establishments in Spain
Animal advocacy parties
Animal welfare organisations based in Spain
Bullfighting in Spain
Criticisms of bullfighting
Political parties established in 2003
Political parties in Spain